"Starz in Their Eyes" is a song by British recording artist Just Jack. Released on 15 January 2007, it was the lead single from his second studio album, Overtones (2007), which was released two weeks later. The song reached number two on the UK Singles Chart on 21 January 2007.

Music video
The music video, directed by Christian Bevilacqua, was released on 13 November 2006. It was also featured in the Dolce & Gabbana Summer 2008 fashion show. The song itself depicts "flop stars" and the negative side to fame and explores the idea of others benefitting financially from the fame of celebrities.

Charts

Weekly charts

Year-end charts

Certifications

References

2007 singles
2007 songs
Just Jack songs
Mercury Records singles
Songs about fame